Curtis Palmer Stevens (June 1, 1898 – May 15, 1979) was an American bobsledder who competed in the 1930s. He won the gold medal in the two-man event at the 1932 Winter Olympics in Lake Placid.

The national champion for bobsleigh in the two-man event is named in Stevens' honor. He died in Lake Placid, New York. He was the brother of fellow bobsledders Paul Stevens and Hubert Stevens.

References

External links
Profile at sports-reference.com
2007 bobsleigh results from Lake Placid featuring Stevens.
Bobsleigh two-man Olympic medalists 1932–56 and since 1964
DatabaseOlympics.com profile

1898 births
1979 deaths
American male bobsledders
Bobsledders at the 1932 Winter Olympics
Olympic gold medalists for the United States in bobsleigh
Medalists at the 1932 Winter Olympics